American Love (French: L'amour à l'américaine) is a 1931 French comedy film directed by Claude Heymann and Pál Fejös and starring Spinelly, André Luguet and Suzet Maïs. Based on a play of the same name, it portrays the romantic escapades of a young American woman in France who falls in love with a married man.

The film's sets were designed by the art director Gabriel Scognamillo.

Cast
 Spinelly as Maud Jennings 
 André Luguet as Gilbert Latour 
 Suzet Maïs as Geneviève Latour 
 Pauline Carton as Pauline 
 Julien Carette as Lepape 
 Andrée Champeaux as Hélène, la bonne 
 Véra Flory as La femme de chambre 
 Isabelle Kloucowski as Ursule Lepape 
 Ragson as La chanteuse 
 Romain Bouquet as L'avocat 
 Roger Blum as L'officier de marine 
 Pierre Darteuil as Un monsieur 
 Anthony Gildès as Un client 
 Lucas Gridoux as Le fakir Habib Khan 
 Pierre Pradier as L'entrepreneur des pombes funèbres 
 Raymond Rognoni as Le beau-père 
 Émile Saint-Ober as L'employé des pombes funèbres
 Pierre Larquey as Le maître d'hôtel à la barbiche
 Pierre Piérade as Un convive

References

Bibliography 
 Goble, Alan. The Complete Index to Literary Sources in Film. Walter de Gruyter, 1999.

External links 
 

1931 films
French comedy films
1931 comedy films
1930s French-language films
Films directed by Paul Fejos
Films directed by Claude Heymann
French black-and-white films
French films based on plays
1930s French films